Stachy is a municipality and village in Prachatice District in the South Bohemian Region of the Czech Republic. It has about 1,100 inhabitants. A part of the village is well preserved and is protected by law as a village monument reservation. The local part of Chalupy is also preserved as is protected as a village monument zone.

Administrative parts
Villages of Jaroškov and Úbislav are administrative parts of Stachy.

References

External links

Villages in Prachatice District
Bohemian Forest